Judith Ann Morris (born 17 February 1947) is an Australian character actress, as well as a film director and screenwriter, well known for the variety of roles she played in 58 different television shows and films, starting her career as a child actress and appearing on screen until 1999, since then she has worked on film writing and directing, most recently for co-writing and co-directing a musical epic about the life of penguins in Antarctica which became Happy Feet, Australia's largest animated film project to date.

Early career
Morris's first role came at the age of 10 when she was part of the cast of the television episode "Picture of the Magi" a Family Theater production which aired about 1957 on the Mutual Broadcasting System in the United States. She then performed in two other roles in the US, at the age of 10 on the Loretta Young Show, and in 1960, at the age of 13, on The Chevy Mystery Show hosted on that occasion by Vincent Price.

Career 
Returning to Australia, Morris's next role was not to come until she reached the age of 20 when, in 1967, she worked in the ABC television series, Bellbird. Impressing casting agents, she was cast in numerous well known television series, including (see drop-down filmography list for further details) seven episodes in Division 4, four episodes in Matlock Police and three episodes in Homicide series.

In 1970, she starred in the short portmanteau film 3 to Go. During this time she also moved to more provocative (for its time) television, especially in the sex series of Alvin Purple, and then under the direction of Tim Burstall as Sybil the babysitter in Libido: The Child (one of four parts of a portmanteau film that showed various aspects of human sexuality).  In this part Morris awakens the sexuality of the boy that she is babysitting.  For her part, Morris won the 1973 Australian Film Industry (AFI) Best Actress in a Lead Role. Morris then played the part of "Sam" in the 1978 movie In Search of Anna, before receiving top billing as the wife "Jill Cowper" in the 1979 black comedy The Plumber, which began its life as a small 6 week television series directed by Peter Weir but following its success was produced as a DVD titled The Mad Plumber.

The 1980s brought further success. She starred in Maybe This Time (1980), Strata (1983), Phar Lap (1983) as Bea Davis, the wife of Phar Lap's owner David J. Davis, and played the part of "Catherine Faulkner", the mother of the main character, "Kat Stanton", (played by Nicole Kidman) in Bangkok Hilton (1989). In 1986 Morris was cast as Margaret 'Meg' Stenning in the miniseries The Last Frontier, that also starred Jason Robards as her father Edward Stenning, fellow Australian Jack Thompson as her brother, the black sheep of the family, Nick Stenning, and American actress Linda Evans as Kate Adamson-Hannon. (This miniseries was released on 3 November 1986). During and after this work she also played the role of "Liz Beare", the daughter-in-law of "Maggie Beare" (played by Ruth Cracknell) in the Mother and Son series that ran from 1984 to 1994. She also starred as an American photographer in Razorback.

Following this, amongst other work, she was cast in the role of "Mrs Muggleton" in eight episodes of the Spellbinder (1995) television series.

In 1996, she had voiced Melba the Crocodile from an animated TV show called Crocadoo.

Writing and directing
Morris wrote and directed the comedy Luigi's Ladies in 1989. Later she teamed up with George Miller and Dick King-Smith to write Babe: Pig in the City in 1998. An episode of Dinotopia in 2002 and then most recently co-wrote the story to the film Happy Feet (along with Warren Coleman, John Collee, and once again, George Miller). Happy Feet was the first Australian animated film to win the Academy Award for Best Animated Feature, and for her part in writing it Morris was nominated for an Annie Award. She later wrote the screenplay for Fred Schepisi's 2011 film, The Eye of the Storm, based on the novel of the same title.

Awards

Morris has been nominated for several awards in her career including:
1973 Nominated and won Australian Film Institute (AFI) award for Best Actress in a Lead Role for Libido: The Child.
1977 Nominated by the AFI for the Best Actress in a lead role for her work in The Picture Show Man.
1980 Nominated by the AFI for Best Actress in a lead role for Maybe This Time.
1986 Nominated by the AFI for Best Actress in a lead role for The More Things Change.
2007 Nominated for an Annie Award for the Best writing in an Animated Production for Happy Feet.

Filmography

Film

Television 
{| class="wikitable sortable"
|-
! Year
! Title
! Role
! class="unsortable" | Notes
|-
|1957
|Loretta Young Show
|Guest role
|TV series US, 1 episode
|-
|1960
|The Chevy Mystery Show
|Guest role
|TV series US, 1 episode
|-
|1967
|Bellbird
|Recurring role
|ABC TV series
|-   
| 1968
| The Gordon Chater Show
| Herself - Guest
| TV series, 1 episode
|-
| 1968
| Rita And Wally
| Guest role
| TV series, 1 episode
|-
| 1968
| Nights Out
| Lead role
| Film short
|-
| 1968
| Juke Box
| Lead role
| Film short
|-
| 1968
| Junior Secondary Maths
| Herself
| TV series
|-
| 1969
| Delta
| Guest role: Girl
| ABC TV series, 1 episode
|-
| 1969
| Australia, The Biggest Island In The World
| Herself
| Film documentary
|-
| 1970
| Stirring The Pool
| unknown role
| TV movie
|-
|1970
|GTK
|Herself
|ABC TV series, 1 episode
|-
| 1970
| Mrs Finnegan
| Guest role: Receptionist
| TV series, 1 episode
|-
| 1970
| Bachelor Gaye
| Regular role
| TV series
|-
| 1970
| Barrier Reef
| Guest role: Gail Smith
| TV series, 1 episode: "Sea Fever"
|-
| 1970-1975
| Division 4
| Guest roles: Policewoman Kim Baker/Lynne Clark/Evie Morris/Helen Roche/Helen Ford/Judy Sutton/Liz Chandler/Sandra Morris (as Judith Morris)
| TV series, 10 episodes
|-
| 1970–1971, 1974
| Homicide
| Margaret Gillespie, Caroline Murray, Prue Fletcher
| Guest roles: TV series, 3 episodes: "Wheels", "Thursday's Child", "The Last Season"
|-
| 1971
| The Comedy Game
| Guest role
| TV series, 1 episode "Arthur"
|-
| 1971–1972;1975
| Matlock Police
| Guest roles: Jenny Fisher, Bel Harris, Sheila Kelly, Jill Thompson
| TV series, 4 episodes: "Early One Morning", "The Milk & Honey Man", "Cat & Mouse", "Baby Doll"
|-
| 1971
| Spyforce
| Guest role: Jill
| TV series, 1 episode
|-
| 1972
| The Lady And The Law
| Lead role: Marion Hall
| TV pilot
|-
| 1972
| 
| Guest role: Fancy
| TV series, 1 episode: "Catch as Catch Can"
|-
| 1972;1973
| Boney
| Guest roles: Kathy Markham / Jill Madden
| TV series, 2 episodes: "Boney and the Claypan Mystery", "Boney and the Paroo Bikeman"
|-
| 1972–1973
| Over There
| Regular role: Elizabeth Kirby
| ABC TV series, 24 episodes 
|-
| 1973
| Ryan
| Guest role: Jan Taylor
 |TV series, 1 episode: "The Little Piggy Went to Pieces"
|-
| 1973–1974
| Certain Women
| Regular role: Marjorie Faber
| ABC TV series, 26 episodes 
|-
| 1975
| Division 4
| Guest role: Kim Baker
| TV series, 3 episodes: "What Will My Friends Say?", "A Bird in the Hand", "Two Hours of Madness"
|-
| 1975
| Cash and Company
| Guest role: Mary Fincham
| TV series, 1 episode: "Dolly Mop"
|-
| 1976
| Luke's Kingdom
| Guest role: Ellen
| TV miniseries, 1 episode: "The Land Lovers"
|-
| 1976
| Alvin Purple
| Guest role: Sophie
| ABC TV series, 1 episode: "O Death, Where Is Thy Sting?"
|-
| 1976
|Master Of The World
| Herself - (voice)
| TV movie
|-
| 1976
| 
| Guest role: Karen
| ABC TV series, 1 episode: "Bad Dream Town"
|-
| 1976
| Mama's Gone A-Hunting
| Lead role: Tessa Goodman
| TV movie
|-
| 1977
| The Dave Allen Show In Australia
| Herself - Various character roles
| TV series, 1 episode
|-
| 1978
| The Making Of Anna
| Herself
| Film documentary
|-
| 1978
|
| Lee
| ABC Teleplay
|-
| 1978
| Cass
| Lead role: Margo
| TV movie
|-
| 1979
| Patrol Boat
| Guest role
| ABC TV series, 1 episode
|-
| 1979
| 
| Lead role: Jill Cowper
| TV movie
|-
| 1979
| Tickled Pink
| Guest role
| ABC TV series, 1 episode
|-
| 1979
| Skyways
| Recurring role: Robyn Davies
| TV series, 12 episodes 
|-
| 1979
| Sammy Awards
| Herself
| TV special
|-
| 1979
| The First Christmas
| Herself - (voice)
| TV short
|-
| 1980
| The Girl Who Met Simone de Beauvoir In Paris
| Lead role
| Film short
|-
| 1981
| Trial By Marriage
| Guest role
| ABC TV series, 1 episode
|-
| 1982
| Spring & Fall
| Guest role: Anne Lawrence
| ABC TV series, 1 episode: "Jimmy Dancer"
|-
| 1984–1994
| Mother and Son
| Semi-Regular role: Liz Beare
| ABC TV series, 18 episodes
|-
| 1985
| Fitness - Make It Your Business
| Herself
| Video documentary
|-
| 1985
| Colour in the Creek
| Regular role: Ellen Fletcher
| TV miniseries, 10 episodes
|-
| 1985
| Time's Raging
| Lead role: Lauren
| ABC TV movie
|-
| 1986
| 
| Recurring role: Meg Stenning
| TV miniseries, 2 episodes
|-
| 1987
| The Last Of The Mohicans
| Herself - (voice)
| TV movie
|-
| 1987
|Resusitation aka You've Probably Saved His Life
| Herself - (voice)
| Film short
|-
| 1988
| 
| Recurring role: Frances Eastwick
| TV miniseries, 5 episodes
|-
| 1989
| Bangkok Hilton
| Recurring role: Catherine Faulkner
| TV miniseries, 3 episodes
|-
| 1991
| Letters From Home
| Herself - voice
| TV series
|-
| 1991
| Eggshells
| Regular role: Kathy Rose
| ABC TV series, 13 episodes 
|-
| 1991
| Tonight Live With Steve Vizard
| Herself - Guest
| TV series, 1 episode
|-
| 1992
| 
| Recurring role: Miss Sowerby
| TV miniseries, 4 episodes
|-
| 1993
| Crocadoo
| Recurring role: Melba (voice)
| ABC TV series, (series 1)
|-
| 1994
| Review
| Herself - Guest Presenter
| ABC TV series, 1 episode
|-
| 1995
| Spellbinder
| Recurring role: Mrs. Muggleton
| TV series, 9 episodes 
|-
| 1995
| This Is Your Life? Ruth Cracknell
| Herself 
| TV series, 1 episode
|-
| 1996
| Crocadoo
| Recurring role: Melba (voice)
| ABC TV series, (series 1)
|-
| 1997
| Heartbreak High
| Recurring Guestr role: Fiona
| TV series, 2 episodes: "6.37", "6.38"
|-
| 1998
| Twisted Tales
| Lead role: Veronica
| TV film series, 1 episode: "The Test"
|-
| 1998
| Crocadoo II
| Recurring role: Melba (voice)
| ABC TV series, Recurring role
|-
| 1999
| Ballykissangel
| Guest role: Laurie Woskett
| TV series UK, 1 episode: "Eureka"
|-
| 2004
| Jaws On Trotters: The Making Of 'Razorback'''
| Herself/Beth Winters
| Video
|-
| 2008
| Not Quite Hollywood: Deleted And Extended Scenes| Herself/Beth Winters
| Video
|-
| 2012
| 1st AACTA Awards| Herself - Writer
| TV special
|-
| 2014
| Razorback: Extended Interviews With Cast And Crew From Mark Hartley's 'Not Quite Hollywood'| Herself/Beth Winters
| Video
|}

 Other works 

Awards

1973 Nominated and won Australian Film Institute (AFI) award for Best Actress in a Lead Role for Libido: The Child.1977 Nominated by the AFI for the Best Actress in a lead role for her work in The Picture Show Man.
1980 Nominated by the AFI for Best Actress in a lead role for Maybe This Time.
1986 Nominated by the AFI for Best Actress in a lead role for The More Things Change.
2007 Nominated for an Annie Award for the Best writing in an Animated Production for Happy Feet''.

References

External links

Information on Judy Morris

1947 births
Australian child actresses
Australian film directors
Australian screenwriters
Australian film actresses
Australian television actresses
Australian women film directors
Best Actress AACTA Award winners
Living people
Logie Award winners
People from Queensland